Handle with Care is a 1977 comedy film directed by Jonathan Demme. It takes place in a small town in Nebraska and is based on the wide popularity of citizens band radio, widely known as CB at the time. The film was originally released as Citizens Band and was later released in an edited version as Handle with Care.

A paperback novelization of the film written by E.M. Corder was published by Pocket Books in 1977.

Plot
Spider is a young man who makes a meager living repairing CB radios and spends his spare time volunteering with REACT International. He lives with his father, an irascible retired truck driver whose CB handle is Papa Thermodyne.

Chrome Angel is a truck driver named Harold who is injured in an accident and then issues an emergency call over CB radio. Spider rescues him and takes him to the hospital. During his recovery, Harold is visited by local prostitute Debbie (alias Hot Coffee), who solicits customers over CB. Chrome Angel has two wives, Connie, who calls herself Portland Angel, and Joyce, who lives in Dallas. The women do not know that he is married to both. The two wives arrive in town to discover that Chrome Angel has been seeing Hot Coffee and that they are married to the same man.

Spider's former fiancée Pam (Electra) is a cheerleading coach and physical-education teacher who conducts erotic conversations over the CB with teenage boys. She is romantically interested in Spider's older brother Dean, who goes by the handle of Blood.

After Spider's activities with REACT are disrupted by a gang of local kids holding a frivolous conversation on Channel 9, which is reserved for emergency communications, he decides to embark on a singlehanded nationwide crusade to shutter illegal CB stations, such as those using unlawful linear amplifiers. Spider's targets include the Red Baron, a neo-Nazi who uses a high-powered CB base station to broadcast white-supremacist monologues, and the Hustler, a teenage boy who reads pornography aloud over the air. Spider and a partner from REACT begin a spree of cutting antenna cables, intimidating offenders by visiting their homes and claiming to be Federal Communications Commission (FCC) officials in the hope of cleaning the CB airwaves.

The myriad complicated friendships and odd romantic relationships finally come to a head. Finally, the whole town comes together in a search-and-rescue effort after Papa Thermodyne suddenly disappears.

Cast

Reception
The film's initial release resulted in disappointing box-office results, leading Paramount to reconsider its campaign and distribution strategy, including renaming the film to deemphasize the CB radio connection because some thought that the word "Band" in the title indicated that it was a musical. The film was renamed Handle with Care for its New York Film Festival showing on September 30, 1977.

The film grossed only $815,530 in the United States and Canada.

Handle with Care currently holds a 100% rating at review aggregator Rotten Tomatoes, with an average critical score of 7.9/10.

John Simon called the film "a lovely, hilarious, semisatirical folk comedy, only needing a better ending."

In 2003, The New York Times placed the film on its Best 1000 Movies Ever list.

References

External links

1977 films
1977 comedy-drama films
American comedy-drama films
Films scored by Bill Conti
Films directed by Jonathan Demme
Films set in Nebraska
Paramount Pictures films
American vigilante films
Citizens band radio in popular culture
1970s English-language films
1970s American films